Fahad Ibrahim Al-Munaif  (born 10 May 1994) is a Saudi footballer who plays as a defender for Al-Riyadh.

On 16 June 2022, Al-Munaif joined Al-Riyadh.

References

External links 
 

Living people
1994 births
Saudi Arabian footballers
Al-Faisaly FC players
Al-Nojoom FC players
Al-Orobah FC players
Al-Qaisumah FC players
Al-Kawkab FC players
Al-Adalah FC players
Al-Riyadh SC players
Place of birth missing (living people)
Saudi First Division League players
Saudi Professional League players
Association football defenders